Especia were a Japanese idol girl group formed in 2012. They participated in the 2015 Tokyo Idol Festival. Their single "Aviator/Boogie Aroma" reached the 28th place on the Weekly Oricon Singles Chart.

Discography

Albums

Singles

DVDs

Notes

References

Japanese idol groups
Japanese girl groups
Musical groups established in 2012
2012 establishments in Japan